The Summit Public Schools is a comprehensive community public school district that serves students in pre-kindergarten through twelfth grade from Summit, in Union County, New Jersey, United States.

As of the 2018–19 school year, the district, comprised of nine schools, had an enrollment of 3,961 students and 349.5 classroom teachers (on an FTE basis), for a student–teacher ratio of 11.3:1.

The district is classified by the New Jersey Department of Education as being in District Factor Group "I", the second highest of eight groupings. District Factor Groups organize districts statewide to allow comparison by common socioeconomic characteristics of the local districts. From lowest socioeconomic status to highest, the categories are A, B, CD, DE, FG, GH, I and J.

In 2019 Niche.com ranked the Summit school district as 6 out of 383 safest and 2 out of 249 in best athletics in regards to New Jersey school districts.

Schools
Schools in the district (with 2018–19 enrollment data from the National Center for Education Statistics) are:
Preschools
Jefferson Primary Center (128 students; in grades PreK-K)
Evan Kozak, Principal
Wilson Primary Center (138; PreK-K)
Evan Kozak, Principal
Elementary schools
Brayton School (340; 1-5)
Dr. Cheryl Moretz, Principal
Franklin School (336; 1-5)
Janice Tierney, Principal
Jefferson School (227; 1-5)
Dr. Joseph Cordero, Principal
Lincoln-Hubbard School (314; 1-5)
Matthew Carlin, Principal
Washington School (346; 1-5)
Dr. Lauren Banker, Principal
Middle school
Lawton C. Johnson Summit Middle School (942; 6-8)
John Ciferni, Principal
Laura Muller, Assistant Principal
Jenna Colineri, Assistant Principal
High school
Summit High School (1,169; 9-12)
Stacy Grimaldi, Principal
Elizabeth Aaron, Assistant Principal
Brian Murtagh, Assistant Principal

Administration
Core members of the district's administration are:
Scott Hough, Superintendent
Derek Jess, Business Administrator / Board Secretary

Board of education
The district's board of education is comprised of seven members who set policy and oversee the fiscal and educational operation of the district through its administration. As a Type I school district, the board's trustees are appointed by the Mayor to serve three-year terms of office on a staggered basis, with either two or three members up for reappointment each year. Of the more than 600 school districts statewide, Summit is one of 15 districts with appointed school boards. The board appoints a superintendent to oversee the day-to-day operation of the district.

References

External links
Summit Public Schools Website

Data for the Summit Public Schools, National Center for Education Statistics
Sports information

New Jersey District Factor Group I
School districts in Union County, New Jersey
Summit, New Jersey